The Gomphillaceae are a family of lichens in the order Ostropales. Species in this family are found mostly in tropical regions.

Genera
According to a recent (2020) estimate, the Gomphillaceae comprise 26 genera and about 420 species. The following list indicates the genus name, the taxonomic authority, year of publication, and the number of species:
 Actinoplaca  – 2 spp.
 Aderkomyces  – 30 spp.
 Aplanocalenia  – 1 sp.
 Arthotheliopsis  – 5 spp.
 Asterothyrium  – 32 spp.
 Aulaxina  – 14 spp.
 Calenia  – 30 spp.
 Caleniopsis  – 2 spp.
 Corticifraga  – 7 spp.
 Diploschistella  – 4 spp.
 Echinoplaca  – 40 spp.
 Ferraroa  – 1 sp.
 Gomphillus  – 6 spp.
 Gyalectidium  – 52 spp.
 Gyalidea  – 50 spp.
 Gyalideopsis  – 91 spp.
 Hippocrepidea  – 1 sp.
 Jamesiella  – 4 spp.
 Lithogyalideopsis  – 4 spp.
 Paratricharia  – 1 spp.
 Paragyalideopsis  – 4 spp.
 Phyllogyalidea  – 2 spp.
 Psorotheciopsis  – 7 spp.
 Rolueckia  – 2 spp.

 Taitaia  – 1 spp.
 Tricharia  – ca. 30 spp.

References

Ostropales
Lichen families
Lecanoromycetes families
Taxa described in 1929